The Haus der Deutschen Weinstraße ("House of the German Wine Route") has since 1995 marked the northern end of the German Wine Route at Bockenheim. In this respect it is a belated balancing feature for the German Wine Gate, 85 kilometers (53 miles) to the south which has marked the southern end of the German Wine Route at Schweigen since 1936.

Apart from its unusual architecture and its position at the end of the German Wine Route, its most obvious feature is a large restaurant, much of which is built out over the road that previously divided Großbockenheim from Kleinbockenheim.

Geography 

The Haus der Deutschen Weinstraße is positioned very close to several social and cultural amenities including the Bockenheim show ground, a sports ground and a community centre.

The Building 
The building's architecture incorporates conscious echoes of a Roman  castra (fortification).   The visible parts of it are predominantly of timber construction, and the supporting entablature is partially exposed.

In addition to a 120 seat restaurant, the building has several meeting rooms available.  A showpiece is the Turmzimmer ("Tower Room") at the top which offers views over the local vineyards and towards the Haardt Mountains beyond. The restaurant opens on to a terrace which is set by the side of a lake which has been created on the site of a pond/wetland area..

References

Buildings and structures in Bad Dürkheim (district)
Wine regions of Germany
German tourist routes
1995 establishments in Germany
Tourist attractions in Rhineland-Palatinate
Anterior Palatinate